George Lionel van Reenen  (29 March 1914 – 12 November 1967) was a South African rugby union player.

Playing career

Test history

See also
List of South Africa national rugby union players – Springbok no. 259

References

1914 births
1967 deaths
South African rugby union players
South Africa international rugby union players
Western Province (rugby union) players
People from Swartland Local Municipality
Rugby union players from the Western Cape